Amy Liptrot is a Scottish journalist and author. She won the PEN Ackerley Prize 2017 and the Wainwright Prize 2016 for her memoir The Outrun.

Biography
The Outrun describes her experience of returning to live in Orkney, where she grew up on a farm, to continue her rehabilitation after ten years in London, during which she had resorted to alcoholism and drug use.

In January 2022, it was announced that Nora Fingscheidt would direct the film adaptation of The Outrun with Saoirse Ronan starring and producing it. 
Filming began in 2022 in Orkney.

 Liptrot had been without alcohol for eight years. She has a child born at Christmas 2018.

She contributed "Swimming Away From My Baby", an essay on wild swimming, to Antlers of Water, a compendium of Scottish nature writing produced during COVID-19 lockdown and edited by Kathleen Jamie.

Her book The Instant was published in 2022, and describes the year she spent living in Berlin after the period covered in The Outrun.

Awards and honours
 PEN Ackerley Prize, 2017
 Wainwright Prize, 2016

References

1986 births
Living people
21st-century Scottish women writers
People from Orkney
Scottish autobiographers
Scottish nature writers
Women autobiographers